Texas Lightning is a 1981 film written and directed by Gary Graver and starring Cameron Mitchell, Cameron Mitchell Jr., Maureen McCormick, and Peter Jason.

The film was originally intended as a serious drama that was to be called The Boys, but the producers demanded that Graver re-edit it into a comedy.

Premise
A tough, macho, truck driver decides to make his soft son more manly by taking him hunting. They vacation and go to a honky tonk bar where the younger man falls in love with a burned out waitress.

Principal cast

Soundtrack
 "Mama Don't Let Your Cowboys Grow Up to Be Babies"
Performed by Tony Joe White
 "Typical Day"
Composed and Sung by Maureen McCormick
 "Texas Lightning"
Lyrics by Christopher Adler
Music by Tommy Vig

References

External links

1981 films
Films set in Texas
Films shot in Texas
1981 comedy-drama films
1981 comedy films
1981 drama films
1980s English-language films
American comedy-drama films
American adventure comedy films
Films directed by Gary Graver
1980s American films